was a Japanese actress and tarento born in Kamishihoro, Katō District, Hokkaido. She was nicknamed . She has one daughter named Reiko.

Filmography

Films

Stage

Direct-to-video

TV series

Dramas

Informal programmes

Variety

Advertisements

Radio

Video games

Discography

References

External links
Tokiwa ni Shikau - Obihiro Sanjo High School 90-nen no Ashiato Bunka Geijutsu Sports-hen – Hanako Tokachi had enrolled in that high school

Japanese women singers
Japanese actresses
Japanese television personalities
Actors from Hokkaido
1946 births
2016 deaths